Heather Regina Oakes (née Hunte born 14 August 1959) is a female English former sprinter who competed mainly in the 100 metres. In the 4 × 100m relay, she won Olympic bronze medals in Moscow 1980 and Los Angeles 1984. She also won a silver medal in the 60m at the 1985 World Indoor Games, and a gold medal in the 100m at the 1986 Commonwealth Games.

Career
Oakes was born in Hackney, London. She was a member of the Haringey Athletic Club. In 1977, as Heather Hunte, she finished fourth in the 100 m final at the European Junior Championships in Donetsk, being edged out of a medal by teammate Kathy Smallwood (11.71 - 11.72). She won a bronze medal in the sprint relay.

On 21 May 1980, at a meeting at the Crystal Palace, she ran the 100 metres in a wind-assisted 11.01 secs (+4.0). Later that year she competed for Great Britain at the Olympic Games in Moscow, where she won a bronze medal in the 4 × 100 metres relay, with her teammates Smallwood, Beverley Goddard and Sonia Lannaman. They ran a UK record of 42.43, which stood as the UK record until 2014. She also placed eighth in the 100 m final in 11.34 secs. In 1982, now competing as Heather Oakes, she finished seventh in the 100 metres final at the Commonwealth Games in 11.39. In 1983, at the World Championships in Helsinki, she reached the semi-finals of the 100 metres, running 11.50.

At the 1984 Olympic Games in Los Angeles, Oakes reunited with two of her Moscow teammates, Kathy Cook (Smallwood)) and Beverley Callender (Goddard) to win another bronze medal in the 4 × 100 m relay, they were joined by Simmone Jacobs. In the 100 m final, she finished seventh in 11.43. She had a fine indoor season in 1985, winning medals at both the World Indoor Games and the European Indoor Championships. At the World Indoors in January in Paris, she won a silver medal in 7.21 secs, just one-one hundredth of a second behind the winner Silke Gladisch. Then at the Europeans in March, she won the bronze medal behind Nelli Cooman and Marlies Gohr, but ahead of Gladisch.

Oakes  became Commonwealth 100 m champion in Edinburgh, Scotland in 1986. She won in a lifetime best time of 11.20 secs. In an incredibly close race, she edged ahead of teammate Paula Dunn (11.21) and Canada's Angella Issajenko (also 11.21). Oakes later teamed up with Dunn, Kathy Cook and Joan Baptiste, to win the gold medal in the sprint relay. Oakes anchored the England quartet to victory  in 43.39. Later in 1986, she reached the semi-finals of both the 100 and 200 metres at the European Championships in Stuttgart. In the 200 m, an event that she rarely contested. she ran a lifetime best of 22.92 secs.

During her career, Oakes won four AAAs National titles and five UK National titles. As of 2022, her legal 100 m best (11.20) ranks her 18th on the UK all-time list, her 200 m best (22.92) ranks her 30th, while her 60 m best (7.21) ranks her 12th.

While Oakes competed at the highest level for her country, she also held down a full-time job. This is in contrast to today's athletes, who through lottery funding and sponsorship are able to train and compete without distraction. She is married to fellow Olympic bronze medallist Gary Oakes.

Personal bests 
60 m 7.21  Paris (Bercy) 19/01/1985 
100 m 11.20  Beijing, CHN 20/09/1980 - ran 11.01 wind-assisted (+4.0) London 21/05/1980
200 m 22.92  Stuttgart, GER 28/08/1986
4 × 100 m relay 42.43 Moscow, RUS 1/08/80  UK Record

National titles
 2-time AAAs (of England) National 100 m champion 1979, 1985 (2nd in 78, 83, 86, 3rd in 80, 82 )
 2-time AAAs National Indoor 60 m champion 1978, 1985
 5-times UK National champion 1979 (100), 1980 (100), 1982 (100), 1984 (100 & 200 m) (2nd at 200 in 1980)

International competitions

Note: Won the 1979 World Cup sprint relay representing Europe. Ran the anchor leg. The other team members were Linda Haglund (SWE),  Chantal Rega (FRA) and Annegret Richter (FRG).

References

External links 
 
 1980 British relay team, 5 March 2006, The Guardian.

1959 births
Living people
People from Hackney Central
Athletes from London
English female sprinters
Black British sportswomen
Olympic athletes of Great Britain
Olympic bronze medallists for Great Britain
Athletes (track and field) at the 1980 Summer Olympics
Athletes (track and field) at the 1984 Summer Olympics
English Olympic medallists
Commonwealth Games gold medallists for England
Commonwealth Games medallists in athletics
Athletes (track and field) at the 1982 Commonwealth Games
Athletes (track and field) at the 1986 Commonwealth Games
World Athletics Championships athletes for Great Britain
World Athletics Indoor Championships medalists
Medalists at the 1984 Summer Olympics
Medalists at the 1980 Summer Olympics
Olympic bronze medalists in athletics (track and field)
Olympic female sprinters
Medallists at the 1986 Commonwealth Games